Andretti Autosport is an auto racing team that competes in the IndyCar Series, Indy NXT, IMSA, and Formula E. The team also has a 37.5% ownership stake in the Australian Supercars Championship touring car team, Walkinshaw Andretti United and a stake in the Extreme E team, Andretti United. It is headed and owned by former CART series champion Michael Andretti.

Since Michael Andretti's involvement, the team has won the Indianapolis 500 five times (2005, 2007, 2014, 2016, 2017) and the IndyCar Series championship four times (2004, 2005, 2007, 2012). The team has won the Indy Lights championship in 2008, 2009, 2018, 2019, and 2021 . Additionally the team has won the Global RallyCross Championship with Scott Speed in 2015, 2016 and 2017. Scott Speed also won the 2018 Americas Rallycross Championship. In 2019 Tanner Foust won the Americas Rallycross title making it five rallycross titles in five years for the Volkswagen Andretti Rallycross team. During the team's early formative years as Team Green, they won both the Indianapolis 500 and CART Championship in 1995.
Andretti Autosport also currently competes in Formula E, which it has been a part of since the series' formation. In 2021, Andretti Autosport partnered with Mexican driver, Michel Jourdain Jr., forming Andretti Jourdain Autosport, to race in Mexico's Super Copa Championship.

CART
The team was founded in 1993 by Barry Green and Gerald Forsythe as Forsythe Green Racing. Forsythe had previously competed in the CART series during the early 1980s under the Forsythe Racing banner and had achieved moderate success.

The new team fielded two Atlantics entries for Claude Bourbonnais and Jacques Villeneuve during the 1993 season. In 1994, the team moved up to the CART series with Villeneuve as the driver. The team scored second place at the 1994 Indianapolis 500 and Villeneuve won one race as a rookie later in the season at Road America.

In 1995, Green and Forsythe parted ways, and Barry Green renamed the outfit Team Green, with his brother Kim Green joining as team manager. The team won the 1995 Indianapolis 500 and 1995 CART championship with driver Jacques Villeneuve. In 1996, the team became known as the Brahma Sports Team for a season, with driver Raul Boesel. In 1997, Parker Johnstone took over the seat, and KOOL cigarettes came on board as the major sponsor. The team became known as Team KOOL Green, and expanded to a two-car effort in 1998 with Paul Tracy and rising star Dario Franchitti. The two stayed on as teammates for five seasons.

In 2001, Michael Andretti joined the organization as a satellite team headed by Kim Green, known as Team Motorola. In addition to running the CART schedule, Andretti entered the 2001 Indianapolis 500. Andretti and Green competed at Indy for the first time after a five-year absence, due to the ongoing open-wheel "split." Andretti won his last race as a driver at the 2002 Grand Prix of Long Beach. During the 2002 season, the team switched from Reynard to Lola chassis due to the former's financial troubles, producing a striking new livery for Franchitti's car to coincide with the change.

In 2002, both Tracy and Franchitti joined Andretti to race at the Indianapolis 500. Due to the MSA, however, primary sponsor KOOL could not appear on the cars, and associate sponsor 7-Eleven was on the sidepods instead. Tracy placed second in a highly controversial finish. The team protested the results, and a lengthy and contentious appeals process dragged on into the summer. Ultimately, Green lost the appeal, to considerable disappointment and at considerable expense.

IndyCar Series

Andretti Green Racing

After major problems in CART surfaced, Andretti, who had purchased a majority interest in the team, switched the newly renamed Andretti Green Racing in 2003 to the rival IndyCar Series.  Tracy left the team to stay in the Champ Car World Series, with Tony Kanaan joining Franchitti and Andretti. Andretti retired after the 2003 Indianapolis 500, and Dan Wheldon took his place.

AGR ran four cars since the beginning of 2004, with Bryan Herta behind the wheel of the additional car. At the 2005 Grand Prix of St. Petersburg, AGR had all 4 drivers finishing 1st, 2nd, 3rd, and 4th; Wheldon led home Kanaan, Franchitti, and Herta to round out the top 4. Kanaan and Wheldon won consecutive IndyCar Series Championships in 2004 and 2005, with Wheldon winning the 2005 Indianapolis 500.  Andretti referred to the win as his very own, as good as if he had won it as a driver, because of the nuances of car ownership and building his team.

Wheldon's championship was his only one before free agency, and joining Target Chip Ganassi Racing in 2006.  He was replaced by Michael's son, Marco Andretti.  Michael Andretti came out of retirement to qualify for the 2006 Indianapolis 500 to race with his son. The Andrettis finished second and third in "the 500" with Marco being passed just before the finish by Sam Hornish Jr. in the second-closest finish in race history. From 2001 to 2010, the team had seen at least one of their drivers finish within the top three at the race.

It was announced on July 25, 2006, that Danica Patrick would join the team for the 2007 IndyCar Series season to replace Herta, who was being transferred to AGR's new American Le Mans Series Acura LMP2 effort.

In October 2007, after winning the 2007 Indianapolis 500 and 2007 Indy Racing League championship, Franchitti announced his departure from the team to pursue a full-time career in the NASCAR Sprint Cup  with Chip Ganassi Racing.  Later that month,  Hideki Mutoh was announced as his replacement in the 27 car.  Mutoh was the runner-up in the 2007 Indy Pro Series season.

The 2008 IndyCar driver lineup returned to the team in 2009. However, for the first time since 2003, the team failed to win a race. Danica Patrick was the team's leading driver finishing 5th in points. Kanaan finished 6th with three podium finishes. The team repeated their Indy Lights championship, this time with American driver J. R. Hildebrand.

On 25 September 2009, the Indianapolis Star reported that Danica Patrick had signed a contract to stay with Andretti Green and the IndyCar Series through 2012.

Andretti Autosport
On 24 November 2009, Andretti Green Racing announced that the team restructuring was complete, and the team would be renamed Andretti Autosport with Michael Andretti as the sole owner.

2010
It was announced on 4 January 2010, that Ryan Hunter-Reay would join the team, replacing Hideki Mutoh.  Hunter-Reay earned the team its first victory since 2008 by winning the Grand Prix of Long Beach. Kanaan picked up the team's second win of the season at Iowa. Kanaan and Hunter-Reay led the team in the points standings, finishing 6th and 7th.

Following the 2010 season, veteran driver Tony Kanaan was released from the team due to the lack of sponsorship. Kanaan later signed with KV Racing Technology. It was announced that the team's other three drivers – Hunter-Reay, Andretti, and Patrick – would return for the 2011 season. Hunter-Reay was signed to a two-year contract through 2012.

2011
The 2011 season marked a return to the victory circle for Andretti Autosport, with Mike Conway winning at Long Beach, Marco Andretti ending a personal 79 race winless drought with his second career win at Iowa, and Ryan Hunter-Reay winning at New Hampshire. Disaster struck at Indianapolis when Mike Conway failed to qualify and Marco Andretti was forced to bump teammate Ryan Hunter-Reay from the final spot in the field, forcing Michael Andretti to purchase the already qualified spot of A. J. Foyt Enterprises driver Bruno Junqueira to meet Hunter-Reay's sponsorship commitments.

In August 2011, Danica Patrick announced her departure from the IndyCar Series to move to NASCAR for the 2012 season; Patrick ran a full-schedule of Nationwide Series events and a limited schedule in the Sprint Cup Series.

At the completion of the 2011 season, Dan Wheldon was due to sign a contract to return to the team in 2012 in the car vacated by Patrick.  He was killed in an accident during the season-ending 2011 IZOD IndyCar World Championship, leaving the future of the #7 GoDaddy team uncertain. In January it was announced that 2011 IndyCar rookie of the year James Hinchcliffe would drive the GoDaddy car renumbered to #27.

2012
In 2012, rumors started that Andretti Autosport would expand to NASCAR's Sprint Cup Series competition in 2013. Jayski's Silly Season Site stated that Andretti Autosport would field a single-car team in the Cup Series in 2013 with Dodge as the manufacturer. Two days later, Dodge reported that there was no deal with Andretti or any team for the 2013 Season. In addition to Patrick being replaced by Hinchcliffe, Mike Conway was not brought back for the 2012 season, leaving the team with three full-time cars. Two additional drivers, Sebastián Saavedra and Ana Beatriz were signed for three and two races respectively, including the Indy 500. With Honda no longer the sole engine supplier for the series, a deal was reached with Chevrolet to provide engines for the team. The team's three drivers qualified second, third, and fourth for the 500, however, the race itself proved a disappointment with only Hinchcliffe completing the full 200 laps, finishing sixth. The eighth race of the season at the Milwaukee Mile would be won by Hunter-Reay, his third podium finish of the year. Hunter-Reay would go on to win three races in a row, adding victories at Iowa and Toronto. A fourth victory in the penultimate race of the season at Baltimore left Hunter-Reay as the only challenger to Will Power for the series championship. Power, whose title had seemed inevitable after dominating the road and street courses early in the season, still had a 17-point lead. On lap 66 of the final race of the season at Fontana, with Power and Hunter-Reay racing side by side, Power spun, narrowly missing Hunter-Reay's car, and went hard into the outer wall. Hunter-Reay would finish in fourth to win the championship.

2013
The three main drivers for the team, Andretti, Hunter-Reay, and Hinchcliffe, all returned for 2013. In addition, E. J. Viso was added as a fourth car for the season, in conjunction with HVM Racing. Rookie driver Carlos Muñoz would also drive an entry for the team in the Indy 500. Muñoz and Zach Veach would be the team's drivers in the lower level Indy Lights series. Andretti would also have entries in the Pro Mazda Championship and the U.S. F2000 National Championship, the feeder series to IndyCar (the "Road to Indy").  The season started strong as Hinchcliffe won the season's first race, the Grand Prix of St. Petersburg, his first IndyCar Series victory. In the second race, the Grand Prix of Alabama, Hinchcliffe suffered a breakdown and would be stuck on the side for most of the race watching teammate Hunter-Reay go on to victory to make the team two for two. The streak broke in week three, with both Hinchcliffe and Hunter-Reay exiting the race early. High and low would go on to be a theme for the team that season. Hinchcliffe would go on to win two more races, but a variety of mechanical problems would see him finish the year eighth. Hunter-Reay would have a similar season, winning two races but finishing the season a disappointing seventh following his 2012 championship. Conversely, Andretti would stay near the top of the standings for most of the season after starting by finishing no worse than 7th in seven of his first eight races, but after two early third-place finishes, he would not see the podium the remainder of the year and finished the season in 5th place. Viso, meanwhile who came into the team with a reputation for being involved in collisions, showed flashes of success, including a fourth-place finish at Milwaukee, but had only two top-ten finishes, a fifth and a ninth, in his final eight races, before dropping out of the season finale stating he had food poisoning. He was replaced for the race by Carlos Muñoz. Muñoz provided a thrill for the team in the Indy 500, taking second place in his first-ever start in the IndyCar series.

2014
Andretti, Hunter-Reay, and Hinchcliffe were once again signed as primary drivers and the team once again began running with full-works Honda power, although GoDaddy dropped their IndyCar sponsorship program and was replaced on the Hinchcliffe car by United Fiber & Data. Viso was not brought back, with Muñoz taking over as the driver of the fourth full-time car. In the 2014 Indianapolis 500, the team fielded a fifth car for NASCAR driver Kurt Busch, who attempted Double Duty. Busch and three of the four full-time Andretti Autosport drivers finished the Indianapolis 500 in the top six, including Hunter-Reay, who won the race. (The only exception was Hinchcliffe, who crashed with 25 laps to go while fighting for 2nd position.). However, Busch, who finished in 6th on the lead-lap, fell short of completing all 1,100 miles for Double Duty when his engine expired on lap 274 of the 2014 Coca-Cola 600.

2015
Andretti fielded a three-car full season effort in 2015 with Marco Andretti, Ryan Hunter-Reay, and Carlos Muñoz. Additionally, Simona de Silvestro, Justin Wilson, and Oriol Servia each joined for races throughout the season. Andretti moved from the 25 team to the 27 team, in light of James Hinchcliffe's departure after 2014. Muñoz's team was renumbered from 34 to 26, while the 25 team fielded de Silvestro, Wilson, and Servia. 2015 saw the debut of the 29 team, where it was the 5th Andretti entry at Indianapolis - de Silvestro was the driver. Andretti claimed two podiums, en route to a 9th place finish in the standings. Hunter-Reay saw a tepid start to 2015, with only 3 top-10 finishes and a best finish of 5th through the first 11 races. However, the 28 team was able to rebound to 6th in the standings after two wins in the final four races. Muñoz claimed his first and only win in IndyCar at Race 1 of the Detroit double-header. However, his worst finish to date at Indianapolis saw him finish 13th in the final standings.

IndyCar champions

Indianapolis 500 victories

American Le Mans Series

In 2006, it was announced that AGR was selected by Honda Performance Development to be one of the official works teams for the new Acura LMP program in the American Le Mans Series.  The team worked with Highcroft Racing on the development of the Courage LC75 chassis.  The team debuted the newly renamed Acura ARX-01 at the 2007 12 Hours of Sebring.  The AGR team finished second overall, and took the maiden LMP2 win for Acura with drivers Dario Franchitti, Marino Franchitti, Bryan Herta, and Tony Kanaan.  However, during the remainder of the season, the Porsche RS Spyders of Penske Racing regularly outpaced the Acuras. The team finished the season 5th in the LMP2 Teams' Championship.

For the 2008 season, the car was driven full-time by Herta and Christian Fittipaldi and occasionally driven by Kanaan at select longer distance events. the 2008 season saw fierce battles between the newly updated Acura ARX-01b, Porsche RS Spyders and the LMP1 Audi R10s. AGR claimed an overall victory at the Detroit race and finished the season with a class victory in the final race at Mazda Raceway Laguna Seca. The team finished the season 4th in the Teams' Championship.

Acura discontinued its relationship with the team for the 2009 season due to mixed results.  The team did not compete in 2009.

U.S. F2000 National Championship
Andretti Autosport announced on March 4, 2010, that they would begin competing in the U.S. F2000 National Championship when they signed Sage Karam.  The team was looking for a teammate for Karam and announced on 26 March 2010, that they had signed Zach Veach to join him. The two have been very active on and off the racetrack.  Karam won the 2010 points championship, Veach had 10 top-five finishes despite missing two events and the team secured the team championship for the 2010 season. Off the track, Karam has spoken at Operation Smile and Veach is working with Oprah Winfrey's No Phone Zone and FocusDriven as a spokesKID for both.

Spencer Pigot replaced the departing Sage Karam for the 2011 season. Pigot finished second in standings, while teammate Veach finished fourth.

Supercars Championship
In 2018, Andretti Autosport entered the Australian Supercars Championship after purchasing a 37.5% shareholding in Walkinshaw Andretti United.

Extreme E 
In April 2020, Extreme E announced that Andretti Autosport became the sixth team to join the series. Andretti Autosport would partner with United Autosport and the team entered the inaugural season as Andretti United Extreme E with Catie Munnings and Timmy Hansen signed as drivers for the team. The team won its first race in the Arctic X-Prix and finished the first season in fourth place. In December 2021, the team announced a title sponsorship deal with American software company Genesys and entered the 2022 season as Genesys Andretti United Extreme E. The team also announced that they have retained Munnings and Hansen. The team finished the second season in fifth place. In February 2023, the team announced a title sponsorship deal with Saudi Arabia automotive company Altawkilat and will enter the 2023 season as Andretti Altawkilat Extreme E. Despite being dropped from the new identity, United Autosport will continue to hold an equity stake in the team. The team retained Munnings and Hansen for the third season in a row, with the pair signing a multiyear extension deal with the team in November 2022.

Formula One
At the end of 2021, there were suggestions Andretti Autosport might purchase Sauber, the operators of the Alfa Romeo team or even Haas, however, these negotiations were unsuccessful.

On 18 February 2022, Mario Andretti announced that his son, Michael, had filed an application with the FIA, Formula One's governing body, to enter Andretti Global in 2024. A week later, Mario Andretti confirmed that they had an agreement with Renault to become an engine supplier of the team. 
The FIA stated that it was not seeking to increase the number of teams on the Formula One grid and some team officials, including CEO of Mercedes F1, Toto Wolff, and team principal of Alfa Romeo, Frédéric Vasseur, were against Andretti's entry, saying that Formula One needed big car manufacturers to add value, like Audi. Red Bull Racing team principal Christian Horner stressed that the problem was the distribution of profits, while owner of Aston Martin, Lawrence Stroll, was in favor of the incorporation of Andretti to Formula One. In another interview, McLaren's CEO Zak Brown showed his support for Andretti, saying other teams that were against Andretti's entry were being short-sighted.

On 5 January 2023, Andretti Global announced their intention to enter Formula One in conjunction with General Motors brand Cadillac. However, the announcement did not specify whether Cadillac would produce its own power unit or rebadge an existing manufacturer's unit. On 11 January, Michael said that two existing teams had stated their support for Andretti joining Formula One, those being McLaren, and Renault's Alpine. FIA president Mohammed Ben Sulayem was surprised at the 'adverse reaction' by the teams and Formula One Management (FOM) to Andretti's project and tweeted in support of Andretti.

Drivers

CART (1994–2002)
 Jacques Villeneuve (1994–1995)
 Raul Boesel (1996)
 Parker Johnstone (1997)
 Dario Franchitti (1998–2002)
 Paul Tracy (1998–2002)
 Michael Andretti (2001–2002)

IRL / IndyCar Series (2001–present)
 Michael Andretti (2001–2003, 2006–07)
 Dario Franchitti (2002–2007)
 Paul Tracy (2002)
 Tony Kanaan (2003–2010)
 Robby Gordon (2003)
 Bryan Herta (2003–2006)
 Dan Wheldon (2003–2005)
 A. J. Foyt IV (2006) 
 Marco Andretti (2006–present)
 Danica Patrick (2007–2011)
 Hideki Mutoh  (2008–2009)
 Franck Montagny (2009) 
 Ryan Hunter-Reay (2010–2021)
 Adam Carroll (2010)
 John Andretti (2010-2011) 
 Mike Conway (2011)
 James Hinchcliffe (2012–2014, 2020–2021)
 Sebastián Saavedra (2012)
 Ana Beatriz (2012)
 E. J. Viso (2013)
 Carlos Muñoz (2013–2016)
 Kurt Busch (2014) 
 Simona de Silvestro (2015)
 Justin Wilson (2015)
 Oriol Servià (2015)
 Alexander Rossi (2016–2022)
 Townsend Bell (2016)
 Takuma Sato (2017)
 Fernando Alonso (2017) 
 Jack Harvey (2017)
 Zach Veach (2018–2020)
 Colton Herta (2020–present)
 Romain Grosjean (2022–present)
 Devlin DeFrancesco (2022–present)
 Kyle Kirkwood (2023-present)

Indy NXT / Indy Lights (1996–2000, 2005–present)
 Chris Simmons (1996–1997)
 Greg Ray (1996)
 Mark Hotchkis (1997)
 Naoki Hattori (1997–1998)
 Jonny Kane (1999–2000)
 Jeff Simmons (2000)
 Marco Andretti (2005)
 Jonathan Klein (2006)
 Jaime Camara (2006–2007)
 Wade Cunningham (2007)
 Arie Luyendyk Jr. (2008)
 Raphael Matos (2008)
 J. R. Hildebrand (2009)
 Charlie Kimball (2010)
 Martin Plowman (2010)
 Stefan Wilson (2011)
 James Winslow (2011)
 Peter Dempsey (2011)
 Sebastián Saavedra (2009, 2012)
 Carlos Muñoz (2012–2013)
 Sage Karam (2013)
 Zach Veach (2013–2014)
 Matthew Brabham (2014–2015, 2022)
 Shelby Blackstock (2015–2016)
 Dalton Kellett (2016–2018)
 Dean Stoneman (2016)
 Colton Herta (2017—2018)
 Ryan Norman (2017–2019)
 Nico Jamin (2017)
 Patricio O'Ward (2018)
 Jarett Andretti (2019)
 Oliver Askew (2019)
 Robert Megennis (2019–2021)
 Devlin DeFrancesco (2021)
 Danial Frost (2021)
 Kyle Kirkwood (2021)
 Sting Ray Robb (2022)
 Christian Rasmussen (2022)
 Hunter McElrea (2022-present)
 Louis Foster (2023-present)
 Jamie Chadwick (2023-present)

ALMS (2007–2008)
 Dario Franchitti (2007)
 Marino Franchitti (2007)
 Bryan Herta (2007–2008)
 Tony Kanaan (2007–2008)
 Christian Fittipaldi (2008)
 Marco Andretti (2008)
 Franck Montagny (2008)
 James Rossiter (2008)
 Raphael Matos (2008)

A1GP (2008–2009)
 Charlie Kimball (2008)
 Marco Andretti (2008–2009)
 Adam Carroll (2008–2009)
 J. R. Hildebrand (2008–2009)

Star Mazda Championship / Pro Mazda Championship / Indy Pro 2000 Championship (2011–2015, 2020)
 Sage Karam (2011–2012)
 Zach Veach (2011–2012)
 Shelby Blackstock (2013–2014)
 Matthew Brabham (2013)
 Garett Grist (2014)
 Weiron Tan (2015)
 Dalton Kellett (2015)
 Devlin DeFrancesco (2020)

USF2000 (2010–2013)
 Sage Karam (2010)
 Zach Veach (2010–2011)
 Spencer Pigot (2011)
 Thomas McGregor (2012)
 Shelby Blackstock (2012)
 Austin Cindric (2013)
 Luca Forgeois (2013)
 Garett Grist (2013)

Red Bull Global RallyCross (2014–2018)
 Tanner Foust (2014–2018)
 Scott Speed (2014–2018)

Formula E (2014–present)
 Franck Montagny (2014)
 Charles Pic (2014)
 Matthew Brabham (2014)
 Jean-Éric Vergne (2014–2015)
 Marco Andretti (2015)
 Scott Speed (2015)
 Justin Wilson (2015)
 Simona de Silvestro (2015–2016)
 Robin Frijns (2015–2017)
 António Félix da Costa (2016–2019)
 Alexander Sims (2017–2020)
 Kamui Kobayashi (2017)
 Tom Blomqvist (2018)
 Maximilian Günther (2019–2021)
 Jake Dennis (2020–present)
 Oliver Askew (2021–2022)
 André Lotterer (2023–present)

Americas Rallycross (2018–2019)
 Scott Speed (2018)
 Cabot Bigham (2019)
 Tanner Foust (2018–2019)

Formula Regional Americas (2020)
 Danial Frost (2020)

Extreme E (2021–present)
 Catie Munnings
 Timmy Hansen

IMSA (2021–present)
 Jarett Andretti (2021–present)
 Marco Andretti (2021)
 Oliver Askew (2021)
 Josh Burdon (2021–2022)
 Gabby Chaves (2022–present)
 Rasmus Lindh (2022–present)
 Dakota Dickerson (2023–present)
 Filipe Albuquerque (2023–present)
 Ricky Taylor (2023–present)
 Louis Deletraz (2023–present)
 Brendon Hartley (2023–present)
 Ryan Briscoe (2023–present)
 Kyle Marcelli (2023–present)
 Ashton Harrison (2023–present)
 Daniel Formal (2023–present)

Racing results

Indy Car World Series/CART
(key)

 The Firestone Firehawk 600 was canceled after qualifying due to excessive g-forces on the drivers.

Indy Racing League/IndyCar Series
(key)

* Season still in progress

  Non-points-paying, exhibition race.
  The final race at Las Vegas was canceled due to Dan Wheldon's death.
  In conjunction with AFS Racing.
  In conjunction with Conquest Racing.
  In conjunction with Bryan Herta Autosport and Curb-Agajanian.
  In conjunction with McLaren-Honda.
  In conjunction with Michael Shank Racing.
  In conjunction with Bryan Herta Autosport with Marco Andretti and Curb-Agajanian

IndyCar wins

Infiniti Pro Series/Indy Pro Series/Indy Lights
(key)

 In conjunction with Steinbrenner Racing.

Star Mazda/Pro Mazda Championship
(key)

U.S. F2000 National Championship
(key)

Formula E
(key)

Notes
  – In the inaugural season, all teams were supplied with a spec powertrain by McLaren.
  – The team opted to revert to the previous McLaren motor used in the inaugural season.
  – Kobayashi, a Japanese driver, raced under a Monégasque license.
 † – Driver did not finish the race, but was classified as he completed over 90% of the race distance.
 * - Season still in progress.

Global RallyCross Championship
(key)

Complete Extreme E results

(key)

References

External links

 
Andretti purchases majority interest of Team Green
IndyCar Team Profile

IndyCar Series teams
American auto racing teams
American Le Mans Series teams
Champ Car teams
A1 Grand Prix racing teams
Indy Lights teams
Formula E teams
Global RallyCross Championship teams
Auto racing teams established in 1993
WeatherTech SportsCar Championship teams
Supercars Championship teams
BMW in motorsport
Andretti family
Formula Regional teams